Ivan Mašek (28 July 1948 in Prague – 7 January 2019) was a Czech politician who served as a Deputy between 1993 and 1998.

References

1948 births
2019 deaths
Czech politicians
Charter 77 signatories
Politicians from Prague
Prague University of Economics and Business alumni